The New England Association of Schools and Colleges, Inc. (NEASC) is a United States' regional accreditation association providing educational accreditation. NEASC serves over 1500 public, independent schools, and technical/career institutions in the six New England states (Connecticut, Maine, Massachusetts, New Hampshire, Rhode Island, and Vermont), the United States, plus international schools in more than 85 nations worldwide. Its headquarters is in Burlington, Massachusetts.

NEASC is made up of three commissions: the Commission on Independent Schools (NEASC-CIS), the Commission on International Education (NEASC-CIE), and the Commission on Public Schools (NEASC-CPS). The commissions decide matters of accreditation in the context of research-driven standards reviewed by their membership. The New England Commission of Higher Education (NECHE), formerly part of NEASC, was organized in late 2018 as a separate and independent entity, in accordance with the requirements of the U.S. Department of Education.

NEASC Accreditation is a system of accountability that is ongoing, voluntary, and comprehensive in scope. It is based on a rigorous set of standards that encompass all aspects of a school, center, or institution’s operation. In accordance with the independent, voluntary nature of accreditation, the standards are developed and reviewed periodically by the NEASC commissions and the membership in order to remain in alignment with current research, best practices, and pertinent governmental regulations in the US and abroad. It does not compare or rank schools, but rather respects differences in institutional populations, missions, and cultures, and fosters institutional growth.

See also
 Educational accreditation
 New England Commission of Higher Education
 United States Department of Education

Notes

External links
 

School accreditors
Organizations based in Massachusetts
Organizations established in 1885
K-12 schools
Educational organizations based in the United States